Jerome Miller may refer to:

Jerome A. Miller (born 1946), American philosopher
Jerome B. Miller (1846–1920), American politician from Wisconsin
Jerome G. Miller (1931–2015), American social worker
Jerome Miller, character in The Killer Elite

See also
Jerry Miller (disambiguation)